Selina Tobaccowala is an entrepreneur and software product executive. While in college, she came up with the idea for an online invitation service and she and a fellow Stanford student co-founded Evite and built the platform to scale.  Later she led teams at Ticketmaster upon successful exit for Evite, becoming SVP of Product and Technology at Ticketmaster, where she oversaw European engineering and product operations.

She next was VP engineering and product at SurveyMonkey joining in 2009 and becoming president and chief technology officer, leading the company to become the world’s dominant online survey platform, with 16 million surveys processed per day. She then co-founded Gixo in 2016 to improve on global health and activity rates with an innovative live workout fitness start-up. In 2019, Gixo was acquired by Beachbody, and Tobaccowala moved from Gixo CEO to become Chief Digital Officer of Openfit, leading engineering, product, and design. Tobaccowala serves on the board of Redfin and Vital Voices.

Career 
Selina Tobaccowala attended Stanford University in Stanford, California and graduated with a bachelor's degree in computer science. While in college, she and fellow Stanford student Al Leib founded Evite in 1997. She served as vice president of engineering at Evite until 2001, when Evite was acquired by Ticketmaster. After managing the transition, she became senior vice president of product at Ticketmaster's Europe division.

Tobaccowala joined SurveyMonkey in 2009 as vice president of product and engineering, before becoming president and chief technology officer.

In 2016, Tobaccowala joined with her Evite co-founder, Al Lieb, to start Gixo, a fitness app that streams live exercise classes to mobile devices. Gixo was acquired by Openfit / Beachbody in 2019 </ref>.

She has served on the board of Tugboat Yards. She currently serves on the board of Redfin, and on the advisory board to HubSpot.

References 

Year of birth missing (living people)
Living people
Stanford University alumni
American women engineers
American company founders
American women company founders
American women chief executives
American people of Indian descent
21st-century women engineers
21st-century American women